David Cockburn (born 12 October 1949) studied philosophy at St Andrews and Oxford, and has taught at Swansea, the Open University, and, until 2010, has spent over 30 years at the University of Wales, Lampeter, where he teaches courses on the philosophy of mind, Spinoza, Wittgenstein among others. He held a British Academy Readership in 1994–96, during which he wrote Other Times. He also holds a deep interest and involvement in the human rights group Amnesty International.

Publications
for a complete list visit Lampeter's website

As author
An Introduction to the Philosophy of Mind (Palgrave, 2001)
Other Times: Philosophical perspectives on past, present and future (Cambridge University Press, 1997)
Other Human Beings (Macmillan, 1990)
Hume (Open University Press, 1983)

As editor
Death and the Meaning of Life (Trivium 27, 1992)
Human Beings (Proceedings of the Royal Institute of Philosophy Conference, Cambridge University Press, 1991)

References

 http://www.uwtsd.ac.uk/staff/david-cockburn

British philosophers
Living people
Academics of the Open University
Academics of the University of Wales, Lampeter
Academics of the University of Wales Trinity Saint David
1949 births
David
Alumni of the University of Oxford
Alumni of the University of St Andrews